The 1710 British general election produced a landslide victory for the Tories. The election came in the wake of the prosecution of Henry Sacheverell, which had led to the collapse of the previous government led by Godolphin and the Whig Junto.

In November 1709 the clergyman Henry Sacheverell had delivered a sermon fiercely criticising the government's policy of toleration for Protestant dissenters and attacking the personal conduct of the ministers. The government had Sacheverell impeached, and he was narrowly found guilty but received only a light sentence, making the government appear weak and vindictive. The trial enraged a large section of the population, and riots in London led to attacks on dissenting places of worship and cries of "Church in Danger".

The government's unpopularity was further increased by its enthusiasm for the war with France, as peace talks with the French king Louis XIV had broken down over the government's insistence that the Bourbons hand over the Spanish throne to the Habsburgs. The Tories' policy of pursuing peace appealed to a country worn out by constant war. Queen Anne, disliking the Junto and sensing that the government could not survive long, gradually replaced it with a Tory ministry throughout the summer of 1710.

The election was bitterly contested in almost all the counties and "open" boroughs, even when a poll was not held. Contests occurred in 131 constituencies in England and Wales; approximately half of all English and Welsh constituencies.

The overwhelming Tory victory surprised few, and following the election most remaining Whigs resigned from office. The new government was led by the moderate Tory Robert Harley who was unpopular among the more partisan Tories. Harley's ministry faced increasing pressure from the extremists whose position in Parliament had been enormously strengthened by the result.

Summary of the constituencies
See 1796 British general election for details. The constituencies used were the same throughout the existence of the Parliament of Great Britain.

Dates of election
The general election was held between 2 October 1710 and 16 November 1710. At this period elections did not take place at the same time in every constituency. The returning officer in each county or parliamentary borough fixed the precise date (see hustings for details of the conduct of the elections).

Results

Seats summary

See also
 3rd Parliament of Great Britain
 List of MPs elected in the British general election, 1710
 List of parliaments of Great Britain

References
 British Electoral Facts 1832–1999, compiled and edited by Colin Rallings and Michael Thrasher (Ashgate Publishing Ltd 2000). (For dates of elections before 1832, see the footnote to Table 5.02).

External links
 History of Parliament: Members 1690–1715
 History of Parliament: Constituencies 1690–1715

1710 in politics
1710 in Great Britain
1710